Werner "Kress" Meyer (30 May 1914 – 10 September 1985) was a Swiss field handball player who competed in the 1936 Summer Olympics Berlin, Germany.

He was part of the Swiss field handball team, which won the bronze medal. He played in three matches of the Olympics.

External links
profile

1914 births
1985 deaths
Swiss male handball players
Olympic handball players of Switzerland
Field handball players at the 1936 Summer Olympics
Olympic bronze medalists for Switzerland
Olympic medalists in handball
Medalists at the 1936 Summer Olympics